An elastomer is a polymer with viscoelasticity (i.e. both viscosity and elasticity) and with weak intermolecular forces, generally low Young's modulus (E) and high failure strain compared with other materials. The term, a portmanteau of elastic polymer, is often used interchangeably with rubber, although the latter is preferred when referring to vulcanisates. Each of the monomers which link to form the polymer is usually a compound of several elements among carbon, hydrogen, oxygen and silicon. Elastomers are amorphous polymers maintained above their glass transition temperature, so that considerable molecular reconformation is feasible without breaking of covalent bonds. At ambient temperatures, such rubbers are thus relatively compliant (E ≈ 3 MPa) and deformable. Their primary uses are for seals, adhesives and molded flexible parts. Application areas for different types of rubber are manifold and cover segments as diverse as tires, soles for shoes, and damping and insulating elements.

Rubber-like solids with elastic properties are called elastomers. Polymer chains are held together in these materials by relatively weak intermolecular bonds, which permit the polymers to stretch in response to macroscopic stresses.

Elastomers are usually thermosets (requiring vulcanization) but may also be thermoplastic (see thermoplastic elastomer). The long polymer chains cross-link during curing (i.e. vulcanizing). The molecular structure of elastomers can be imagined as a 'spaghetti and meatball' structure, with the meatballs signifying cross-links. The elasticity is derived from the ability of the long chains to reconfigure themselves to distribute an applied stress. The covalent cross-linkages ensure that the elastomer will return to its original configuration when the stress is removed.

Examples
Unsaturated rubbers that can be cured by sulfur vulcanization:
 Natural polyisoprene: cis-1,4-polyisoprene natural rubber (NR) and trans-1,4-polyisoprene gutta-percha
 Synthetic polyisoprene (IR for isoprene rubber)
 Polybutadiene (BR for butadiene rubber)
 Chloroprene rubber (CR), polychloroprene, neoprene, Baypren etc.
 Butyl rubber (copolymer of isobutene and isoprene, IIR)
 Halogenated butyl rubbers (chloro butyl rubber: CIIR; bromo butyl rubber: BIIR)
 Styrene-butadiene rubber (copolymer of styrene and butadiene, SBR)
 Nitrile rubber (copolymer of butadiene and acrylonitrile, NBR), also called Buna N rubbers
 Hydrogenated nitrile rubbers (HNBR) Therban and Zetpol

Saturated rubbers that cannot be cured by sulfur vulcanization:
 EPM (ethylene propylene rubber, a copolymer of ethene and propene) and EPDM rubber (ethylene propylene diene rubber, a terpolymer of ethylene, propylene and a diene-component)
 Epichlorohydrin rubber (ECO)
 Polyacrylic rubber (ACM, ABR)
 Silicone rubber (SI, Q, VMQ)
 Fluorosilicone rubber (FVMQ)
 Fluoroelastomers (FKM, and FEPM) Viton, Tecnoflon, Fluorel, Aflas and Dai-El
 Perfluoroelastomers (FFKM) Tecnoflon PFR, Kalrez, Chemraz, Perlast
 Polyether block amides (PEBA)
 Chlorosulfonated polyethylene (CSM), (Hypalon)
 Ethylene-vinyl acetate (EVA)

Various other types of 4S elastomers:
 Thermoplastic elastomers (TPE)
 The proteins resilin and elastin
 Polysulfide rubber
 Elastolefin, elastic fiber used in fabric production
 Poly(dichlorophosphazene), an "inorganic rubber" from hexachlorophosphazene polymerization

See also
 Liquid elastomer molding
 Rubber elasticity

References

External links
 Efficient and eco-friendly polymerization of elastomers, By Andreas Diener, Product Manager at List AG

 
Materials science
Polymer physics